"Take Care of Home" is a song  performed by American contemporary R&B singer Dave Hollister, issued as the second and final single from his second studio album Chicago '85... The Movie. The song peaked at number 39  on the US Hot R&B/Hip-Hop Songs chart in 2001.

Music video

The official music video for the song was directed by J. Jesses Smith.

Chart position

References

External links
 
 

2000 songs
2001 singles
DreamWorks Records singles
Dave Hollister songs
Song recordings produced by Tim & Bob
Songs written by Tim Kelley
Songs written by Bob Robinson (songwriter)